Edmund "Ed" J. Copeland is a theoretical physicist, cosmologist, and professor of physics working in the Faculty of Science at the University of Nottingham, United Kingdom. Copeland won the 2013 Rayleigh Medal and Prize awarded by the Institute of Physics for his work on particle/string cosmology. He obtained his PhD from the University of Newcastle upon Tyne in 1985, with a thesis entitled "Quantum aspects of Kaluza-Klein cosmologies".

Copeland is well known for his appearances on the physics-popularizing YouTube channel Sixty Symbols, as well as the mathematics-popularizing channel Numberphile.

References

Academics of the University of Nottingham
Mathematics popularizers
Science communicators
Living people
Year of birth missing (living people)